The 1989 Summer Deaflympics, officially known as the 16th Summer Deaflympics, is an international multi-sport event that was held from 7 to 17 January 1989 at Queen Elizabeth II Park in Christchurch, New Zealand.

Medal Tally

References

External links
 Official games website 

Deaflympics
1989 in New Zealand sport
Parasports in New Zealand
January 1989 sports events in New Zealand
Sport in Christchurch